Percival George "Percy" Trotter (1 September 1883 – 27 August 1959) was an Australian rules footballer who played for the Fitzroy Football Club in the Victorian Football League (VFL), Essendon Association in the Victorian Football Association (VFA) and East Fremantle in the West Australian Football League (WAFL).

Family
The son of George Thomas Trotter (1858-1910), and Mary Trotter (1857-1951), née Brookman, Percival George Trotter was born at Fitzroy, Victoria on 1 September 1883.

He married Annie Ethel Martin (1887-1928) on 5 October 1904.

Football career

Fitzroy (VFL)
Trotter played as a rover and was versatile in that he could kick well with both feet. He debuted in 1901 at the age of 18. In 2002 Trotter was named on the interchange bench in Fitzroy's official 'Team of the Century'.

East Fremantle (WAFL)
Trotter's time with East Fremantle was interrupted by his service in World War I.

Training Units team (AIF)
He played in the famous "Pioneer Exhibition Game" of Australian Rules football, held in London, in October 1916. A news film was taken at the match.

See also
 1916 Pioneer Exhibition Game

Footnotes

References
 Pioneer Exhibition Game Australian Football: in aid of British and French Red Cross Societies: 3rd Australian Division v. Australian Training Units at Queen's Club, West Kensington, on Saturday, October 28th, 1916, at 3pm, Wightman & Co., (London), 1919.
 Holmesby, Russell and Main, Jim (2007). The Encyclopedia of AFL Footballers. 7th ed. Melbourne: Bas Publishing.
 Photograph at Butler, Steve (2017), "Haydn Bunton Jr accepts elevation of his father to WA Football Hall of Fame in emotional final event at Subiaco Oval", The West Australian, Monday, 27 November 2017.
 An Incident in the Game: Running with the Ball, The Winner, (Wednesday, 10 January 1917), p.4.
 First World War Embarkation Roll: Private Percy George Trotter (5791), collection of the Australian War Memorial.
 First World War Nominal Roll: Private Percy George Trotter (5791), collection of the Australian War Memorial.
 First World War Service Record: Private Perry (sic) George Trotter (5791), National Archives of Australia.
 Richardson, N. (2016), The Game of Their Lives, Pan Macmillan Australia: Sydney.

External links

 
 
 Percy Trotter, at The VFA Project.

1883 births
1959 deaths
Australian rules footballers from Melbourne
Australian Rules footballers: place kick exponents
Fitzroy Football Club players
Fitzroy Football Club Premiership players
Participants in "Pioneer Exhibition Game" (London, 28 October 1916)
Essendon Association Football Club players
Mitchell Medal winners
East Fremantle Football Club players
Australian military personnel of World War I
Two-time VFL/AFL Premiership players
People from Fitzroy, Victoria
Military personnel from Melbourne